Christian Raymond (born 24 December 1943) is a French former professional road bicycle racer. In 1970 Raymond won a stage in the 1970 Tour de France. He also competed in the individual road race at the 1964 Summer Olympics.

Raymond's 12-year-old daughter was the source of the nickname of the great cyclist Eddy Merckx.  Raymond was a rider in the Peugeot team in 1969.  When he explained to his daughter how the race had gone, she said: "That Belgian, he doesn't even leave you the crumbs... he's a cannibal."  The nickname stuck.

Major results

1966
Massiac
1967
Miramas
Périers
Vayrac
1968
Bain-de-Bretagne
1970
Fougères
Ploërdut
Tour de France:
Winner stage 19
1971
Saint-Macaire en Mauges
1974
Circuit des genêts verts
Maël-Pestivien
Rieux

References

External links 
 
 Official Tour de France results for Christian Raymond

1943 births
Living people
French male cyclists
French Tour de France stage winners
Cyclists at the 1964 Summer Olympics
Olympic cyclists of France
Sportspeople from Maine-et-Loire
Cyclists from Pays de la Loire